Melpomène was a 44-gun frigate of the French Navy, designed by Sané. She was launched in 1812. In 1815 HMS Rivoli captured her. The Royal Navy never commissioned Melpomène and in 1821 sold her for breaking up.

Career 
Melpomène was commissioned on 1 June 1812 in Toulon under Commander Charles Béville. She took part in the action of 5 November 1813, where she sustained light damage and had one wounded.

She was decommissioned on 21 February 1814, but reactivated in January 1815 under Captain Joseph Collet, at Toulon.

On 24 April, during the Hundred Days, she was sent to Napoli to transport Letizia Ramolino. Six days later, at 6a.m. on the 30th, she encountered the 74-gun HMS Rivoli off Ischia, commanded by Captain Edward Stirling Dickson. After a 35-minute fight, Melpomène struck to the ship of the line.

Although a key French source states that Melpomène was scuttled, she was not. The Royal Navy sailed her to Portsmouth, where she arrived on 28 December 1815. There she was laid up. She was not commissioned and was not fitted for sea. She was sold on 7 June 1821 at Portsmouth to a Mr. Freake for £2,460.

In May, the frigate Dryade brought Ramolino to France, along with Prince Jérôme Bonaparte.

Citations and references

Citations

References 
 Fonds Marine. Campagnes (opérations ; divisions et stations navales ; missions diverses). Inventaire de la sous-série Marine BB4. Tome deuxième : BB4 1 à 482 (1790-1826) 
 
 

Age of Sail frigates of France
1812 ships
Pallas-class frigates (1808)
Ships built in France
Captured ships
Fifth-rate frigates of the Royal Navy